Keley is a rural locality (a selo) in Ust-Kansky District, the Altai Republic, Russia. The population was 130 as of 2016. There are 3 streets.

Geography 
Keley is located 36 km north of Ust-Kan (the district's administrative centre) by road. Ust-Muta and Verkh-Muta are the nearest rural localities.

References 

Rural localities in Ust-Kansky District